Associazione Sportiva Dilettantistica Polisportiva Ribera 1954 was an Italian football club based in Ribera, Sicily.

History

Foundation 
The club was founded in 1954 as 'A.S. Ribera Calcio.

Serie D 
In the season 2011–12 the team was promoted for the first time, from Eccellenza Sicily/A to Serie D.

In summer 2013 the club wasn't able to enter 2013–14 Serie D and was so subsequently liquidated.

Colors and badge 
The team's colors were white and light blue.

Stadium 
The game field Nino Novara has been the only in Serie D in the beaten earth, that does not have the Common nor the club, the necessary money to set up a grass field.

Honours
Eccellenza:
Winner (1): 2011–12

References

External links

Football clubs in Italy
Football clubs in Sicily
Association football clubs established in 1954
Association football clubs disestablished in 2013
1954 establishments in Italy
2013 disestablishments in Italy
Ribera, Agrigento